Lungga Plantation is a suburb of Honiara, Solomon Islands and is located East of Lungga Point.

References

Populated places in Guadalcanal Province
Suburbs of Honiara